Arthur Montford (25 May 1929 – 26 November 2014) was a Scottish Television sports journalist, best known for his 32-year tenure as the presenter of Scottish Television's Scotsport.  Although he was most associated with football, he covered a number of other sports for ITV, notably golf.

Early life
Montford was raised in Greenock and was a lifelong supporter of local football club Greenock Morton.

Journalism

Montford worked as both a print journalist and radio broadcaster before joining Scottish Television in August 1957 as a continuity announcer. He was then chosen to present STV's new sports programme, Scotsport (originally Sports Desk), where he remained as anchorman for 32 years. In all, he hosted over 2,000 editions of the programme. During his time on Scotsport, Montford became famous for his trademark checkered pattern sports jackets, and some classic lines of football commentary, including What a Stramash! and Disaster for Scotland!

Despite being committed to Scotsport, Montford continued to continuity announce with STV as a relief announcer by providing cover on occasions when other announcers were absent at any time.

He also presented the Scottish version of World of Sport which was broadcast under the Scotsport banner - most notably on Scottish Cup final days but also whenever regional sporting events were being televised live by STV and Grampian.

During the 1978 FIFA World Cup, a technical fault with the feed from Argentina prevented ITV from broadcasting Hugh Johns' commentary on the Scotland-Peru game, so Montford's commentary, originally only intended for Scottish viewers, was used on the entire network (the same fault affected the BBC in reverse, with Scottish viewers having to listen to David Coleman instead of Archie MacPherson).

Montford's last Scotsport programme was live coverage of the 1989 Scottish Cup Final. After retiring from television, Montford continued to comment on Scottish football, both in the national press and in the matchday programme at Morton. In 1990, he narrated the film documentary Scotland: The World Cup Story. In late 2010, Montford served as an occasional commentator on the Greenock Morton webcast.

In May 2010, Montford received the SPFA Special Merit award for his services to football broadcasting and journalism alongside fellow broadcaster Archie Macpherson.

Other positions
He served as a director of Greenock Morton for several years under the chairmanship of his close friend Douglas Rae. After stepping down as a director, Montford continued his affiliation with the club as an Honorary Vice-President.

In 1974, Montford was elected as Rector of the University of Glasgow, the first sports journalist to receive the honour. He remained in the position until 1977.

Montford wrote a column for Scottish golf magazine, Bunkered. His recollections of some of golf's greatest players, moments, and tournaments were popular with the magazine's readers and he was the title's longest-serving regular contributor.

He died on 26 November 2014 aged 85. His funeral was held in Bearsden on 3 December.

References

1929 births
2014 deaths
Scottish association football commentators
Scottish sportswriters
Scottish television journalists
Golf writers and broadcasters
Greenock Morton F.C. non-playing staff
Journalists from Glasgow
People from Inverclyde
Rectors of the University of Glasgow